Guy David may refer to:

 Guy David (footballer)
 Guy David (mathematician)

See also
 David Guy, American military aviator